Culp is a locality in Alberta, Canada.

The locality has the name of J. H. Culp, a railroad official.

References 

Localities in the Municipal District of Smoky River No. 130